Spheroids of human autologous matrix-associated chondrocytes, sold under the brand name Spherox, is a medication used to repair defects to the cartilage in the knee in adults who are experiencing knee pain and problems moving the knee.

The most common side effects include arthralgia (joint pain) and joint effusion (accumulation of liquid in the knee), which can cause swelling of the joint.

Spherox contains spheroids (spherical aggregates) of chondrocytes, cells found in healthy cartilage, that have been prepared from the patient's own tissues.

Medical uses 

To prepare the medicine, a small sample is taken by arthroscopy (a type of keyhole surgery) from the patient's cartilage in the knee. The cartilage cells are then grown in the laboratory to prepare a suspension of chondrocyte spheroids. During arthroscopy, the medicine is placed into the damaged area of the patient's cartilage. The chondrocyte spheroids attach to the cartilage within 20 minutes. People treated with Spherox should follow a specific rehabilitation program including physiotherapy. This allows the chondrocyte spheroids to fill in the cartilage defect.

History 
Spherox has been shown to improve symptoms and knee function in two studies in adults between 18 and 50 years of age. The main measure of effectiveness was the KOOS (knee injury and osteoarthritis outcome score), which is graded on a scale of 0 to 100 (where 0 means severest symptoms and 100 means no symptoms). The KOOS was self-measured by participants rating the severity of their symptoms such as pain, impact on daily living, sport and recreational activities, and quality of life.

In the first study involving 102 participants, Spherox was compared with microfracture (a type of surgery used to treat defects in cartilage). Preliminary data from this study after one year show that Spherox improved the outcome score by 22 points and was as effective as microfracture.

All these participants received treatment with Spherox, as microfracture is not recommended to repair large defects. In this study, participants' outcome scores with Spherox improved by 16 points in the first year and further improvements were seen up to three years after treatment.

See also 
 Autologous chondrocyte implantation
 Knee cartilage replacement therapy

References

External links 

Cartilage replacement therapy